StraighterLine is a U.S. educational company that offers low-price, online higher education courses that are equivalent to general courses required for a bachelor's degree. The American Council On Education’s College Credit Recommendation Service (ACE CREDIT) has evaluated and recommended college credit for StraighterLine courses.  The company is itself unaccredited, but has over 150 partnerships with accredited colleges and universities that accept its courses for credit.

Courses
The company primarily offers McGraw-Hill course content delivered via a Moodle learning management system. StraighterLine charges a flat monthly rate, plus a charge for each course taken. Straighterline requires proctoring for a course final exam. eTextbooks and tutoring are included for free with course purchase.

StraighterLine offers more than 60 online college courses as of August 2022. 

The company has strategic partnerships with the Educational Testing Service and the makers of the Collegiate Learning Assessment, as part of a plan to expand into offering validated tests from leading educational organizations.

Professor Direct
StraighterLine launched professor led courses in December, 2012. Professor Direct allows professors to set their own premiums on courses, charging any amount of their choosing per student. This is the first time a business or school has allowed professors to set their own prices for courses that lead to college credit. Students can choose between 8- and 15-week cohorts, or self-paced formats. At time of launch StraighterLine had 15 professors with masters or doctorate degrees.

Partners
StraighterLine has a network of over 150 partner colleges that guarantee full credit transfer, with nearly 2,000 additional institutions having accepted StraighterLine credits in the past. In 2016, the U.S. Department of Education selected StraighterLine to participate in the EQUIP program to test a financial aid partnership with Dallas County Community College District and the Council for Higher Education Accreditation. In April 2018, StraighterLine launched its new partnership through the Department of Education's EQUIP Pilot Initiative. The program was the first of eight selected by the U.S. Department of Education (DOE) for its Educational Quality through Innovation Partnerships (EQUIP) initiative to launch to students. Through the EQUIP experiment, students will be allowed, for the first time, to use federal student aid to enroll in programs offered by innovative, nontraditional education providers that are partnering with accredited colleges or universities.

The online course provider began operations and has served over 150,000 students as of 2021.

History
The company was founded in 2008 as a division of Smarthinking, Inc., an online tutoring provider, and was spun out in 2010, shortly before Smarthinking was acquired by Pearson PLC.  In 2011, the company was named one of "The 10 Most Innovative Companies in Education" by Fast Company (magazine). In 2017, the company was named an "Innovator Worth Watching" by The Christensen Institute. StraighterLine has had multiple rounds of investment, and in April 2012 received a 10-million dollar investment. Investors include: FirstMark Capital, City Light Capital, and Chrysalis Ventures.

The company is growing rapidly, in January 2012 StraighterLine was at 11 employees, by July 2012 it was at 22. As of September 2017, the company was at 50.

CEO

Heather Combs is the current CEO of StraighterLine.

Criticism

Courses such as Straighterline are highly controversial with educators. Professors at Northern Virginia Community College, one of the schools involved with Straighterline, have voiced their objections to their administrators, citing lack of standards and rigor for testing. Additionally, complaints from students whose credits from courses they completed did not transfer to degree-granting institutions have been registered in online reviews and with the BBB. The company retains an A+ rating with the Better Business Bureau.

References

External links

Education companies of the United States
Education companies established in 2008
Companies based in Baltimore
2008 establishments in Maryland